The 2002 Molson Indy Toronto was the eighth round of the 2002 CART FedEx Champ Car World Series season, held on July 7, 2002 on the streets of Exhibition Place in Toronto, Ontario, Canada.

Qualifying results

Race 

* Townsend Bell was excluded from the race after making contact with Bruno Junqueira on lap 93.  He was fined $10,000 and placed on probation.

Caution flags

Notes 

 New Race Record Cristiano da Matta 2:06:19.372
 Average Speed 93.361 mph

External links
 Friday Qualifying Results
 Saturday Qualifying Results
 Race Results
 Townsend Bell gets fine, probation after Toronto

Toronto
Indy Toronto
Toronto
2002 in Toronto